Nagpur CR railway division is one of the five railway divisions under Central Railway zone of Indian Railways. This railway division was formed in 1867 and its headquarter is located at Nagpur in the state of Maharashtra of India.

It covers an East part of the state of Maharashtra and small part of Southern Madhya Pradesh.

Bhusawal railway division,  Solapur railway division,  Mumbai CR railway division, and Pune railway division are the other  railway divisions under CR Zone headquartered at  Mumbai CST.

List of railway stations and towns 
The list includes the stations  under the Nagpur CR division and their station category.

Stations closed for Passengers - 23 numbers
Kesla, Polapathar, Magardoh, Chard cabin, Chitoda jn, Yenor, Chotipadoli, Vivekand nagar, Dipori, Sorta, Virur, Rohna -1, Rohna-2, Dhanori, Pargothan, Khubgaon, Pachegaon, Arvi, Majri khadan,M ukutban, Umrer, Rajur, Ghugus

Routes

Badnera Jn(Exclude)- Pulgaon Jn - Wardha Jn - Butibori Jn-Nagpur Jn
Pulgaon Jn-Arvi (Narrow Gauge)
Butobori Jn - Umrer
Wardha Jn- Majri Jn - Tadali Jn - Chandrapur-Balharshah Jn(Include)
Majri Jn - Wani Jn - pimpalkutti
Wani Jn - rajur
Tadali Jn - Ghugus
Balharshah Jn - Chanda Fort
Nagpur-Amla Jn-Itarsi Jn(exclude)
Amla -Chhindwara(exclude)

References

 

Divisions of Indian Railways
Transport in Nagpur